Thomas Beaufort, styled 1st Count of Perche (c. 1405 – 3 October 1431) was a member of the Beaufort family and an English commander during the Hundred Years' War.

He was the third son of John Beaufort, 1st Earl of Somerset and his wife, Margaret Holland.

Career
With his elder brother, Henry Beaufort, 2nd Earl of Somerset, Thomas joined in Henry V's 1419 campaigns in France.  In 1421, he accompanied the king's younger brother Thomas of Lancaster to the fighting in Anjou.  Lancaster was killed at the Battle of Baugé while John Beaufort, the new Earl of Somerset (following the death of Henry Beaufort, 2nd Earl of Somerset at the  Siege of Rouen) and Thomas were captured. Thomas was eventually released around 1427 in a prisoner exchange negotiated by his uncle, Cardinal Beaufort.

As an able male member of the Beaufort family, Thomas rejoined the fighting almost immediately. He was granted the title Count of Perche in December 1427, his title being more a claim to land, rather than a recognized title since it was already held by the French Duke John II of Alençon. This was part of a continuing attempt by Cardinal Beaufort to carve out estates for his nephews from conquered French land. During the 1430 royal coronation expedition of Henry VI, Thomas was granted a retinue of 128 soldiers and 460 archers. He commanded soldiers at a battle at La Charité-sur-Loire in late 1430 and died 3 October 1431 at the siege of Louviers, three weeks before the city's fall.

Arms
As the legitimised great-grandson of Edward III he bore his arms altered by a bordure gorbony argent and azure.

Ancestry

Notes

References
 

 
 

1405 births
1431 deaths
Thomas Beaufort, Count of Perche
People of the Hundred Years' War